This is a list of the songs that were number one on the UK Dance Singles Chart in 1987, according to the MRIB.

References

United Kingdom Dance
1987
1987 in British music